George Eogan, MRIA (14 September 1930 – 18 November 2021) was an Irish archaeologist.

He was born in Nobber, County Meath, and studied at University College Dublin (UCD) and then Trinity College Dublin. In 1965, he was appointed to a lectureship at UCD, becoming a professor in 1979, and also serving as head of department from then until 1995.

Eogan was particularly known for his work over forty years at Knowth, having been director of the Knowth Research Project.  In 1968, he became the first person in over a millennium to enter the east-side tomb at the site.

Eogan was also appointed an independent member of Seanad Éireann, serving from 1987 until 1989.

References

1930 births
2021 deaths
Academics of University College Dublin
Alumni of Trinity College Dublin
Alumni of University College Dublin
Independent members of Seanad Éireann
Irish archaeologists
Members of the 18th Seanad
People from County Meath
Nominated members of Seanad Éireann
Members of the Royal Irish Academy